The Grosser Preis der Badischen Wirtschaft is a Group 2 flat horse race in Germany open to thoroughbreds aged four years or older. It is run at Baden-Baden over a distance of 2,200 metres (about 1 mile and 3 furlongs), and it is scheduled to take place each year in late May or early June.

The event was originally called the Grosser Preis der Badischen Wirtschaft, and it was initially a 1,800-metre race for horses aged three or older. Its distance was extended to 2,200 metres and the minimum age was raised to four in 1983.

The race was sponsored by Mercedes-Benz from 2001 to 2007, and during this period it was known as the Grosser Mercedes-Benz-Preis. It was renamed the Grosser Preis der Badischen Unternehmen in 2008. In 2016, the race recovered its original name, Grosser Preis der Badischen Wirtschaft.

Records
Most successful horse (2 wins):
 Star Appeal – 1974, 1975
 Hohritt – 1980, 1981
 Abary – 1984, 1985
 Night Magic – 2010, 2011

Leading jockey (5 wins):
 Georg Bocskai – Los Santos (1982), Abary (1984, 1985), Acatenango (1986), Turfkönig (1990)
 Andrasch Starke - Germany (1996), Oxalagu (1997), Caitano (1999), Sweet Wake (2005), Danedream (2012)

Leading trainer (7 wins):
 Heinz Jentzsch – Ulan (1972), Los Santos (1982), Abary (1984, 1985), Acatenango (1986), Astylos (1988), Astico (1989)

Winners

 Tres Rapide finished first in 2009, but she was relegated to third place following a stewards' inquiry.
 The 2010 running took place at Hoppegarten.
 The 2021 running took place at Mülheim.

See also
 List of German flat horse races

References
 Racing Post:
 galopp-sieger.de – Grosser Preis der Badischen Unternehmen.
 horseracingintfed.com – International Federation of Horseracing Authorities – Race Detail (2011).
 pedigreequery.com – Grosser Preis der Wirtschaft – Baden-Baden.

Horse races in Germany
Open middle distance horse races